Southwestern Academy is a non-profit, co-educational college preparatory school for grades 6–12, with two campuses — one in San Marino, California, and the other in Rimrock, Arizona, United States. The school is accredited by WASC (Western Association of Schools and Colleges). The school offers boarding and day enrollment for 145 students for grades 6–12 in San Marino and 40 students for grades 9–12 at the Rimrock campus. Postgraduate year studies are offered at both campuses. Students can transfer between the two campuses. The school was founded in 1924 by Maurice Veronda, whose son, Kenneth, became headmaster after his death, and remained in that position for 60 years. Longtime teacher and Administrative Dean, Robin Jarchow, who's been a part of the Southwestern family for 30 years, is the current Head of School/CEO.

Students at both campuses follow the same college-preparatory curriculum and take advantage of their surrounding attractions for both studies and free-time activities.

Half of the school's enrollment is international and the rest is from around the United States. All graduates go to American universities and community colleges.

References

Boarding schools in California
High schools in Los Angeles County, California
Educational institutions established in 1924
Boarding schools in Arizona
Private high schools in Arizona
Schools in Yavapai County, Arizona
Private high schools in California
Private middle schools in California
Preparatory schools in California
1924 establishments in California